Theodore Humphrey Fowler (25 September 1879 – 17 August 1915) was an English cricketer. He played for Gloucestershire between 1901 and 1914. He died on active service as a lance corporal in the Honourable Artillery Company during World War I.

References

1879 births
1915 deaths
English cricketers
Gloucestershire cricketers
People from Cirencester
Dorset cricketers
Sportspeople from Gloucestershire
British Army personnel of World War I
Honourable Artillery Company soldiers
British military personnel killed in World War I